Copiague is a station on the Babylon Branch of the Long Island Rail Road, located in Copiague, New York. The station is located on Marconi Boulevard and Great Neck Road (Suffolk County Road 47), one block north of Oak Street (Suffolk County Road 12).

History

Original station 
The South Side Railroad of Long Island and Central Railroad of Long Island once had another station in Copiague to the east called Belmont Junction, which was in service between 1873 and 1885. It is not known if the Long Island Rail Road built Copiague Station as a replacement for Belmont Junction, but it had served as one.

Current station 
Copiague Station was originally built in 1902, and was rebuilt with temporary high-level platforms for the M1s on October 25, 1968. The original station was replaced with the current elevated station which opened on August 7, 1973. It is one of the few railroad stations along the Babylon Branch west of Patchogue that was not originally built by the South Side Railroad of Long Island.

Station layout
The station has one 10-car-long high-level island platform between the two tracks.

References

External links 

 Copiague Station (Arrt's Arrchives)
 Great Neck Road entrance from Google Maps Street View
 Station House from Google Maps Street View
 east entrance from Google Maps Street View

Long Island Rail Road stations in Suffolk County, New York
Railway stations in the United States opened in 1902